The LK (from ; GRAU index: 11F94) was a lunar module (lunar lander designed for human spaceflight) developed in the 1960s as a part of several Soviet crewed lunar programs. Its role was analogous to the American Apollo Lunar Module (LM). Three LK modules, of the T2K variant, were flown without crew in Earth orbit, but no LK ever reached the Moon. The development of the N1 launch vehicle required for the lunar flight suffered setbacks (including several launch failures), and the first Moon landings were achieved by US astronauts on Apollo 11. As a result, having lost the Space Race, both the N1 and the LK programs were cancelled without any further development.

The N1-L3 flight plan

Sergei Korolev, the lead Soviet rocket engineer and spacecraft designer during the 1950s and 1960s, planned to adopt the same lunar orbit rendezvous concept as seen in the Apollo programme. The lunar expedition spacecraft L3 was to consist of a Soyuz 7K-L3 Command Ship (a variant of the Soyuz) and an LK Lander. L3 would carry a two-man crew atop a single three-stage superheavy N-1 booster. A fourth stage, the Blok G, would push the L3 (LOK+LK) toward the Moon, with the Blok D as a fifth stage.

Lunar orbit
The Blok D engine would also slow the L3 into lunar orbit. Following the coast to the Moon, one cosmonaut would spacewalk from the LOK (Soyuz 7K-L3) to the LK (Lunniy Korabl) lander and enter it. He would then separate the Blok D stage and the LK from the LOK before dropping toward the Moon using the Blok D engine.  Once slowed from orbital velocity and placed on a trajectory to the vicinity of the landing site by the Blok D, the LK would separate from the Blok D and continue the descent and landing using its Blok E stage on the LK for terminal deceleration and landing.

Lunar landing
An earlier uncrewed probe of the Luna programme, a Lunokhod would be used to select a suitable area, and then act as a beacon for the LK. A backup LK would then be launched to the landing site. The third step would see a crewed LK landing with a single cosmonaut.

Although the specifics on planned activity while on the lunar surface remain vague, the small size and limited payload capacity of the N-1/Soyuz LOK/LK compared to the Saturn/Apollo meant that not much in the way of scientific experiments could have been performed. Most likely, the cosmonaut would plant the Soviet flag on the Moon, collect soil samples, take photographs, and deploy a few small scientific packages.

Earth return
After a day on the lunar surface the LK's engine would fire again, using its landing leg structure as a launch pad. To save weight, the engine used for landing would also blast the LK back to lunar orbit for an automated docking with the LOK, using the Soyuz Kontakt docking system. The cosmonaut would then spacewalk back to the LOK carrying the Moon rock samples, and the LK would then be cast off. After this, the LOK would fire its rocket for the return to Earth. The LK's docking port was a latticework of 96 hexagon-shaped holes arranged in an isometric grid, each as a potential docking port for the snare-shaped probe of the LOK to fit in without precise alignment of the two craft. Due to weight restrictions, the docking interface was designed to be as simple as possible, with a strictly mechanical interlock and no electrical or fluid connections. Docking and undocking were only possible a single time.

Design
The LK spacecraft can be subdivided into the lunar landing aggregate ("Lunnyi Posadochnyi Agregat", "LPA") and the lunar ascent vehicle, ("Lunnyi Vzletnyi Apparat", "LVA'"). Propulsion, both for landing and lifting off the Moon was based on the Blok E propulsion system. The Information Display System (spacecraft control panels and controls) version was called Luch.

The four missions using an LK used the T2K variant, almost identical to the standard LK, but without landing gear.

Systems
The spacecraft included the following systems:
 Pressurized cosmonaut compartment;
 Flight control avionics;
 Life-support system;
 Attitude control systems;
 Lunar landing device, or LPU, with four landing legs;
 Power supply system, consisting of chemical batteries attached to LPU;

Instruments
The spacecraft included the following instruments:
 Planeta landing radar
 pressurized avionics container
 two communication antennas
 three batteries
 four containers with water for a vaporization unit
 robotic arm and drill

Testing
The LK variant T2K was tested uncrewed in Earth orbit over three missions as Kosmos 379, Kosmos 398 and Kosmos 434. The first test was on November 24, 1970, the second on February 26, 1971, and the third on August 12, 1971.
All three LKs were launched with the Soyuz-L rocket. The first flight imitated the planned working cycle of the Blok E stage. The second and third flights were intended to test the LK's behavior under several flight anomalies. All flights went well, and the LK was considered ready for crewed flight.

Cancellation
The success of the Apollo program in putting American astronauts on the Moon in 1969 meant that the United States won the Moon race, although plans were being drawn right up until the early 1970s. Four N1 launches were attempted including two later with dummy LK but all were failures, despite engineering improvements after each failure. The second launch attempt on July 3, 1969, just 13 days prior to the launch of Apollo 11, was a catastrophic failure which destroyed both the rocket and the launch complex. Subsequently, the complete L3 lunar expedition complex with regular LK and Soyuz 7K-LOK module-spacecraft for Moon flyby and landing by full uncrewed mission of future crewed scenario was prepared for fifth launch of modified N1 rocket in August 1974. The N1-L3 program was cancelled in May 1974 and the Soviets decided to concentrate on the development of space stations, achieving several firsts in the process.

In 2017, there was an anonymous claim that Chinese officials asked the Ukrainians to rebuild the very original LK's propulsion module using modern materials like new computer technology replacing obsolete electronics in the module's flight control system. According to the agreement, Ukrainians will transfer China the newly produced set of design documentation for the propulsion module, but the hardware itself will remain in Ukraine. In the future, Ukrainians might assist the Chinese in organizing the production of the technology in China, sources said.

LK compared to the Apollo Lunar Module

Because the payload capacity of the N1 rocket was only 95 tons to LEO, versus the Saturn V's 140 tons to LEO, the LK was created to be less bulky than the Apollo Lunar Module (LM):

 It had a different landing profile
 It was lighter at only one-third the mass of the LM
 Initially the LK was to have carried a single cosmonaut. A later variant would have a two-man crew; the LM carried two
 It had no docking tunnel like the LM's; the cosmonaut would space walk from the LOK (Soyuz 7K-L3) to the LK and back. 
 To leave lunar orbit and begin descent, the LK used the same braking stage, the Blok D, which put the LK-Soyuz stack into lunar orbit; the LM used its landing stage engine (later Apollo missions also used the SPS engine to help deorbit the LM).
 The final deceleration, from a velocity of 100 m/s at an altitude of 4 km above the lunar surface, was done with a Blok E stage, capable of multiple restarts. This allowed the Blok E to also serve as the ascent stage to return the LK to lunar orbit; the LM's landing stage had a dedicated engine for landing.
 For better performance, LK Blok E engines used turbopumps to provide them with fuel components. Solid charges were used for quick activation of the pumps that limited the number of ignitions.
 After landing the LK landing gear structure was designed to serve as a mini-launch complex for the upper stage's lift-off; the Apollo LM used its descent stage in the same fashion.
 The LK Blok E had both primary and reserve engines allowing for reassurance of ascent; the Apollo LM lifted off with a single ascent engine, and had no backup or reserve but was designed for simplicity and reliability allowing for optimal assurance of ascent. A failure of the LM ascent engine would guarantee a critical mission failure.

Current location

There are five remaining LK in various stages of completion. They are at:
 Moscow Aviation Institute (temporarily displayed at Disneyland Paris)
 Orevo Research and Educational Facility of Bauman University in Dmitrov
 RKK Energia plant at Korolev
 Tambov air base
 A.F. Mozhaysky Military-Space Academy in St Petersburg

See also

 Zond program
 Apollo 18 (film)
 Single-person spacecraft
 List of crewed lunar lander designs

References

Crewed spacecraft
Missions to the Moon
Soviet lunar program